The Farr 30 (formerly Mumm 30) was designed by Farr Yacht Design led by Bruce Farr. The first boat was built by Carrol Marine and first launched in 1995. The class was recognised by the World Sailing from 1997 to 2018.

History
The International Farr 30 One Design Class Association  was formed as the owners association to support the class and promote One Design class sailboat racing amongst owners which led to the class becoming an ISAF Recognised Class. This entitles the class to hold World Championships officially recognized by World Sailing.

The boat was originally named the Mumm 30 after its original title sponsor Champagne Mumm. After his sponsorship ended in 2007, the class then rebranded to Farr 30, using a modified version of the Farr 40 class logo. Both the Farr 30 and 40 had been under the management of Geoff Stagg since their inception; however, in 2009 the Farr 30 Class owners association assumed control of the class.

The boat has been produced by a number of builders, with Carrol Marine USA and Ovington Boats GBR building the majority. Other builders are DK Composites and US Watercraft.

Events

World Championship

Tour de France à la voile
In addition to International Class competition, another significant event for the boat was the Tour de France à la voile "Sailing Tour of France" whose organization used the Mumm/Farr 30 exclusively from 1999 to 2010. These fast and sturdy boats were the perfect combination to battle the big seas of the North Atlantic and the howling Mistral winds of the Mediterranean. More information can be found on the event page at Tour de France à la voile.

References

External links
 Official Farr 30 International OD Class Association Website
  ISAF Farr 30 Microsite Website
 Farr Yacht Design Official Website

Former classes of World Sailing
Sailing yachts
1990s sailboat type designs
Sailboat types built by Ovington Boats
Tour de France à la voile